Zofar may refer to the following:
Tzofar, a village in southern Israel
ZFR, VHF omnidirectional range on the J10 Airway in Israel
Ẓófar in the Book of Job

See also
Zophar (disambiguation)